The campaign against female genital mutilation in colonial Kenya (1929–1932), also known as the female circumcision controversy, was a period within Kenyan historiography known for efforts by British missionaries, particularly from the Church of Scotland, to stop the practice of female genital mutilation in colonial Kenya. The campaign was met with resistance by the Kikuyu, the country's largest tribe. According to American historian Lynn M. Thomas, female genital mutilation became a focal point of the movement campaigning for independence from British rule, and a test of loyalty, either to the Christian churches or to the Kikuyu Central Association, the largest association of the Kikuyu people.

Background

The Kikuyu regarded female genital mutilation, which they called irua or circumcision, as an important rite of passage between childhood and adulthood. "Irua" consisted largely of three procedures: removal of the clitoral glans (clitoridectomy or Type I); removal of the clitoral glans and inner labia (excision or Type II); and removal of all the external genitalia and the suturing of the wound (infibulation or Type III). The Kikuyu practised Type II and sometimes Type III.

Uncut Kikuyu women were outcasts, and the idea of abandoning the practice was unthinkable to the vast majority of Kikuyus. Jomo Kenyatta, who became Kenya's first prime minister in 1963, wrote in 1938:

Campaign

The campaign against female genital mutilation had been led since around 1906 by Dr. John Arthur of the Church of Scotland. In March 1928, the issue came to a head when the Kikuyu Central Association announced that it would contest elections to the Native Council, with the defence of Kikuyu culture, including FGM, as its main platform. The following month the church at Tumutumu announced that all baptised members must offer a declaration of loyalty by swearing their opposition to FGM. Several other church missions followed suit. Robert Strayer and Jocelyn Murray write that the stage was set for a major conflict, with neither side willing to compromise.

In 1929 Marion Stevenson, a Scottish missionary, began referring to the procedures as the "sexual mutilation of women", rather than "female circumcision/initiation", and the Kenyan Missionary Council followed suit. Hulda Stumpf, an American missionary who had taken a strong stand against FGM, was murdered in her home near the Africa Inland Mission station in Kijabe in January 1930. The Times reported that "[t]he medical evidence ... inclined to the view that certain unusual wounds were due to the deliberate mutilation such as might have been caused by the use of a knife employed by native in the form of tribal operation." In November 1930, the Supreme Court in Nairobi, acquitting a man of Stumpf's murder, found no evidence that she had been killed because of the FGM campaign.

The issue of FGM was raised in the House of Commons on 11 December 1929 by Katharine Stewart-Murray, Duchess of Atholl and Eleanor Rathbone. The Duchess of Atholl told the House:

Rathbone asked that the words "or sex" be added to the motion before the House: "Native self-governing institutions should be fostered; and franchise and legal rights should be based upon the principle of equality for all without regard to race, colour, or sex."

See also
Women in Kenya
Presbyterian Church of East Africa

Notes

References

Further reading
Murray, Jocelyn (1976). "The Church Missionary Society and the 'Female Circumcision' Issue in Kenya, 1929–1932". Journal of Religion in Africa. 3(2). 

Kenya, colonial
History of Kenya
British Kenya
1929 in Kenya
1930 in Kenya
1931 in Kenya
1932 in Kenya
Women in Kenya
Women's rights in Kenya
Violence against women in Kenya